Benzazepines are heterocyclic chemical compounds consisting of a benzene ring fused to an azepine ring. Examples include:

See also
 Benzodiazepine
 Dibenzazepine

References